Loi Im Lan (born 6 February 1998) is a sprinter from Macau. She represented her country at one outdoor and two indoor World Championships. In addition, she holds Macanese records on several distances.

International competitions

Personal bests
Outdoor
100 metres – 11.67 (+1.7 m/s, Macau 2022) NR
200 metres – 24.73 (+0.4 m/s, Jakarta 2018) NR
400 metres – 57.23 (Macau 2017) NR
Indoor
60 metres – 7.45 (Astana 2023) NR
200 metres – 24.47 (Macau 2017) NR

References

1998 births
Living people
Macau sprinters
World Athletics Championships athletes for Macau
Athletes (track and field) at the 2018 Asian Games
Asian Games competitors for Macau
Competitors at the 2019 Summer Universiade